BICS may refer to:

 Bangladesh Islami Chhatra Shibir, Islamic student organization in Bangladesh
 Basic interpersonal communicative skills, needed to interact in social situations
 Belgacom ICS, Belgian telecoms business
 Bitstream International Character Set, a multi-byte character set by Bitstream
 Bloomberg Industry Classification Standard, an industry classification similar to GICS
 Brussels International Catholic School, an independent pre-primary through secondary school in the European district of Brussels, Belgium. 

Bics may refer to:

 , former basketball team in Hamden, Connecticut, see Continental Basketball Association franchise history

See also 
 BIC (disambiguation)